The Society of Motor Manufacturers and Traders (SMMT) is the trade association for the United Kingdom motor industry. Its role is to "promote the interests of the UK automotive industry at home and abroad."

History
SMMT was founded by Frederick Richard Simms on 16 July 1902. In January 1959 it moved to Forbes House, Halkin Street, Belgravia, and in August 2011 it moved into its current offices at 71 Great Peter Street, London.

Motor Show
One of its early functions was holding motor shows, the earliest of which was at Crystal Palace in January 1903 (now known as the British International Motor Show). The Motor Industry Research Association (MIRA) was formed in 1946. In 1978, the Motor Show moved to the National Exhibition Centre. In 2006, the Motor Show returned to London at ExCel in 2006.

Vehicle registrations

In July 1972 it started the Motor Vehicle Registration Information System (MVRIS), which works on behalf of the government to collate data about new registrations of vehicles. Data is obtained from vehicle manufacturers and/or importers and the Driver and Vehicle Licensing Agency. Figures are released on the fourth working day of every month and detailed analysis is available for purchase.

Consumer protection
The Motor Industry Code of Practice for New Cars was launched in 2004, which provides trading standards for consumers, via automotive traders who are registered with the Motor Codes code of practice. The UK car industry has had a reputation of a minority of garages and repair companies giving consumers a less-than-satisfactory level of performance, with (generally) female consumers being cynically targeted for excessive costs for maintaining their cars. Call-out charges for repairs and roadside breakdowns have been known to be uncompetitively high. The Motor Industry Code of Practice for Service and Repair was launched in August 2008 to correct any cowboy practices of financial manipulation. More than 4,000 garages across the UK now are registered with this scheme. It was claimed by the National Consumer Council that substandard repair work by UK garages was costing consumers around £4 billion a year.

Activities
The organisation "promotes the interests of the UK automotive industry at home and abroad" for a sector that produced 1.6 million vehicles - including cars and commercial vehicles - and 2.71 million engines in the UK (2018) and employs a UK workforce of more than 823,000. The organisation advocates and lobbies on behalf of the sector, in particular for vehicle and component manufacturers, and the motor retail sector.

It settles any disputes on cars in the UK that are still under warranty. It monitors combined sales of cars in the UK.

Each year in May, it holds the SMMT Test Day for invited motoring journalists at General Motors' Millbrook Proving Ground at Millbrook, Bedfordshire.

Lobbying
Scientists on the Climate Change Committee advised a total ban of petrol and diesel engine sales including for hybrids by 2032 to meet the UK government's decarbonisation goals. The SMMT lobbied the government to delay this ban.  The resulting delay was a "significant victory for the car industry" according to The Guardian.

Structure
Aside from the Secretariat, who run the organisation on a daily basis with around 80 staff in 13 departments, and the Executive, there are many working groups and technical committees for trade sectors, and for research and marketing topics in the car industry. The future of the British automotive industry is facing many technical challenges with strict EU emission legislation, and the introduction of electric and fuel cell vehicles.

See also
 Automobile safety
 Euro NCAP
 Good Garage Scheme
 Transport Research Laboratory
 Royal Society for the Prevention of Accidents

References

External links
 The Society of Motor Manufacturers and Traders official website
 Motor Codes
 SMMT Industry Forum Ltd
 Europe-wide motor manufacturer organisations

Video clips
 Low carbon buses at Energy Live News
 Vince Cable and low carbon vehicles

1902 establishments in the United Kingdom
Automobile associations in the United Kingdom
Automotive industry in the United Kingdom
Motor trade associations
Non-profit organisations based in the United Kingdom
Organisations based in the City of Westminster
Organizations established in 1902
Trade associations based in the United Kingdom